Perceval Press is actor/artist Viggo Mortensen's publishing company, established 2002 with partner Pilar Perez. Based in Santa Monica, California, the press specializes in books of art, critical writing, and poetry.

General information
Mortensen started Perceval Press to publish individuals who may otherwise have gone unnoticed and to do so without compromise, while keeping prices as low as possible.

Perceval Press is known for its use of high-quality printing materials and press procedures, all of which are personally supervised by Mortensen, who has been called an "Indie Publishing Mogul" by The New York Times.

Slate
Perceval Press's slate is diverse, exploring poetry, song, graphic and fine arts, photography, fiction and non-fiction, scholarly essays and literature. Some of the books and CDs are by Mortensen himself, or in direct collaboration with other artists.

Mortensen once publicly complained that his work on the film Appaloosa caused him to fall behind in his 2007 obligations to Perceval Press and its slate of artists.

References

External links
 Perceval Press website

Book publishing companies based in California
Companies based in Santa Monica, California
Publishing companies established in 2002
2002 establishments in California
American companies established in 2002